Ana Guiomar (born 26 August 1988) is a Portuguese actress, known for her character Marta Navarro in the youthful series, "Morangos com Açúcar" (2004–2006). Later she appeared in the soap opera, "Tempo de Viver" (2006–2007).

External links
 
Winx Club - Stella

1988 births
Living people
Portuguese television actresses
Actresses from Lisbon